The auto24 Rally Estonia 2016 was the seventh running of the Rally Estonia and also the sixth round of the 2016 European Rally Championship season. The event was won by Ralfs Sirmacis & Māris Kulšs after Alexey Lukyanuk & Alexey Arnautov crashed out from the lead on the penultimate stage.

Report

Classification

Special stages

References

External links
 

2016 in Estonian sport
2016 European Rally Championship season
Rally Estonia
Rally Estonia